Saint-Édouard-de-Lotbinière is a parish municipality in the Lotbinière Regional County Municipality in the Chaudière-Appalaches region of Quebec, Canada. Its population is 1,248 as of the Canada 2011 Census. It is named after Édouard Faucher, founder and first priest of the parish, and René-Louis Chartier de Lotbinière, first owner of the seigneurie in which Saint-Édouard lay.

Demographics 

References

Parish municipalities in Quebec
Incorporated places in Chaudière-Appalaches
Lotbinière Regional County Municipality